Thomas Atkinson (1801–1833), was a Scottish poet and miscellaneous writer.

Atkinson was a native of Glasgow, where he carried on business as a bookseller. He followed in the shoes of his father, also Thomas Atkinson, running a bookshop at 80 Trongate under the name of Atknison & Co.

He published, under his own editorship, the ‘Sextuple Alliance’ and the ‘Chameleon,’ and also a weekly periodical, the ‘Ant.’ After the passing of the Reform Bill, he became a candidate in the liberal interest for the representation of the Stirling burghs in parliament, but was unsuccessful. Over-exertion during the contest brought on a dangerous illness, which assumed the character of consumption, and he died on the passage to Barbadoes, 10 October 1833. Daniel Macmillan, founder of the publishing house of Macmillan & Co., was for some time Atkinson's shopman.

He was portrayed by Andrew Henderson.

Monies left in his will created the Atkinson Institution in Glasgow.

References

1801 births
1833 deaths
19th-century Scottish poets